Ellis Griffith may refer to:

 Ellis Ellis-Griffith (1860–1926), British barrister and politician
 Ellis Griffith (priest) (died 1938), Welsh clergyman